In classical mythology, Hylas was a youth who served as Heracles's (Roman Hercules) companion and servant. His abduction by water nymphs was a theme of ancient art, and has been an enduring subject for Western art in the classical tradition.

Genealogy

In Greek mythology, Hylas was the son of King Theiodamas of the Dryopians and the nymph Menodice, daughter of Orion. In some accounts, his father was Euphemus or King Ceyx of Trachis.

Mythology

Heracles 
After Heracles killed Theiodamas in battle, he took on Hylas as his arms-bearer and taught him to be a warrior. The poet Theocritus (about 300 BC) wrote about the love between Heracles and Hylas: "We are not the first mortals to see beauty in what is beautiful. No, even Amphitryon's bronze-hearted son, who defeated the savage Nemean lion, loved a boy—charming Hylas, whose hair hung down in curls. And like a father with a dear son he taught him all the things which had made him a mighty man, and famous."

Argonauts
Heracles took Hylas with him on the Argo, thus making him one of the Argonauts. Hylas was kidnapped by Naiads of the spring of Pegae in Mysia when they fell in love with him, and he vanished into the water with a cry. His disappearance greatly upset Heracles, who, along with Polyphemus, searched for him for a great length of time. The ship soon set sail without them. According to the Latin Argonautica of  Valerius Flaccus, they never found Hylas because the latter had fallen in love with the nymphs and remained "to share their power and their love". In the version told by Apollonios Rhodios, the sea-god Glaucus informs the Argonauts that "a nymph has lost her heart to him and made him her husband". Theocritus, on the other hand, has the nymphs shutting his mouth underwater to stifle his screams for Heracles. Antoninus Liberalis says that the nymphs changed him into Echo.

Literature 

The story of Hylas and the nymphs is alluded to in Book 3 of Edmund Spenser's The Faerie Queene, Canto XII, Stanza 7:

Or that same daintie lad, which was so deare
To great Alcides, that when as he dyde
He wailed womanlike with many a teare,
And every wood, and every valley wyde
He fild with Hylas name; the Nymphes eke "Hylas" cryde.

Hylas is also mentioned in Christopher Marlowe's play Edward II: "Not Hylas was more mourned for of Hercules / Than thou hast been of me since thy exile" (Act I, Scene I, line 142-3), and in Oscar Wilde's The Picture of Dorian Gray, Chapter 11: "...and gilded a boy that he might serve at the feast as Ganymede or Hylas."

Hylas is referred to in Chapter 18 of Charles Kingsley's novel Hypatia, when the Prefect Orontes, rescued by the Goths, is taken for safety into a house largely populated by women, and fancies himself as "A second Hylas".

"Hylas" is the name of one of the two characters in George Berkeley's Three Dialogues between Hylas and Philonous.  He represents the materialist position against which Berkeley (through Philonous) argues. In this context, the name is derived from ὕλη, the classical Greek word for "matter." Stanisław Lem adopted these characters in his 1957 non-fiction, philosophical book, Dialogi (Dialogues).

Hylas is also mentioned in Thomas Hardy's Far from the Madding Crowd: "He called again: the valleys and farthest hills resounded as when the sailors invoked the lost Hylas on the Mysian shore; but no sheep."

See also
 Iolaus
 Lympha
Jason and the Argonauts

References

External links

 Berkeley's Three Dialogues between Hylas and Philonous
 Encyclopædia Britannica on Hylas
 Hylas in the Classical Style by Stefanie E. Dittert, Professor Buttigieg
 Encyclopedia of Greek Mythology on Hylas 
 Poem by Florence Earle Coates

Argonauts
Male lovers of Heracles
Characters in the Argonautica
Thessalian characters in Greek mythology
Demigods in classical mythology
Metamorphoses in Greek mythology